Tofik Radzhabovich Kadimov (born 16 January 1989) is a Russian former football forward.

Club career
He made his debut in the Russian Second Division for FC Dagdizel Kaspiysk on 26 July 2012 in a game against FC Olimpia Volgograd.

He made his Russian Football National League debut for FC Baltika Kaliningrad on 6 July 2014 in a game against FC Shinnik Yaroslavl.

References

External links
 

1989 births
Footballers from Makhachkala
Living people
Russian footballers
Russian sportspeople of Azerbaijani descent
FC Baltika Kaliningrad players
FC Chernomorets Novorossiysk players
Association football forwards